Springfield is an unincorporated community in Kings County, New Brunswick, Canada on Route 124.  It is near the head of Belleisle Bay.

History

Notable people

See also
List of communities in New Brunswick

References

Communities in Kings County, New Brunswick
Settlements in New Brunswick